Clematis montana, the mountain clematis, also Himalayan clematis or anemone clematis, is a flowering plant in the buttercup family Ranunculaceae. A vigorous deciduous climber, in late spring it is covered with a mass of small blooms for a period of about four weeks. The odorous flowers are white or pink, four-petalled, with prominent yellow anthers. It is native to mountain areas of Asia from Afghanistan to Taiwan.

Cultivation
Clematis montana is a popular garden plant in temperate regions, with the ability to scramble up and over unsightly features such as sheds and fences. The plant attracts bees, butterflies, and hummingbirds. Numerous varieties and cultivars have been bred for horticultural use, including:
C. montana 'Alexander'
C. montana var. grandiflora AGM with larger flowers than the species
C. montana var. rubens
'Broughton Star' AGM - double, deep pink flowers
'Elizabeth' - with pale pink flowers
'Freda'
'Pink Perfection'
'Tetrarose' AGM has deep pink flowers.
C. montana var. wilsonii - later flowering, chocolate scented

Those cultivars marked AGM have gained the Royal Horticultural Society's Award of Garden Merit.

Etymology
Clematis is the Greek name for several climbing plants, and is a diminutive of klema, meaning "vine shoot".

The Latin specific epithet montana refers to mountains or coming from mountains.

Collections
The UK national collection of  Clematis montana is held at By The Way, at Woodfalls, near Salisbury, Wiltshire, within the New Forest National Park. Hundreds of clematis are integrated within the garden, many grown from British Clematis Society seed.

References

montana
Flora of Afghanistan
Flora of Myanmar
Flora of China
Flora of the Indian subcontinent
Flora of Taiwan
Plants described in 1817